Cedar Point Farm is a historic home and farm located in Jackson Township, Morgan County, Indiana.  The farmhouse was built in 1853, and is a two-story, Greek Revival style brick I-house with a side gable roof.  It features a two-story, full width front porch. Also on the property are the contributing summer house / summer kitchen, woodshed / smokehouse, English barn, cattle / tromp shed, double corn crib, tractor shed, garage, granary with sheds, privy, hen house, dog house, a wind mill pump, and two hand water pumps.

It was listed on the National Register of Historic Places in 2003.

References

Farms on the National Register of Historic Places in Indiana
Greek Revival houses in Indiana
Houses completed in 1853
Houses in Morgan County, Indiana
National Register of Historic Places in Morgan County, Indiana